Senator McNutt may refer to:

Alexander McNutt (governor) (1802–1848), Mississippi State Senate
Walter McNutt (born 1940), Montana State Senate